Most railway lines in Indonesia were constructed during the Dutch colonial rule. After independence in 1945, many lines were abandoned. The current national rail operator, PT Kereta Api Indonesia (Persero), was founded on 28 September 1945.

Pre-independence era

First railway line

Indonesia (Dutch East Indies) is the second country in Asia to establish a rail transport, after India; China and Japan were next to follow. On 7 June 1864, Governor General Baron Sloet van den Beele initiated the first railway line in Indonesia on Kemijen village, Semarang, Central Java. By 21 May 1873, the line had connected to Solo, both in Central Java and was later extended to Yogyakarta.
This line was operated by a private company, Nederlandsch-Indische Spoorweg Maatschappij (NIS or NISM) and used the  gauge. Later construction by both private and state railway companies used the  gauge.

The liberal Dutch government of the era was then reluctant to build its own railway, preferring to give a free rein to private enterprises. However, private railways could not provide the expected return of investment (even NIS required some financial assistance from the government), and the Dutch Ministry of Colonies finally approved a state railway system, the Staatsspoorwegen (SS), extending from Buitenzorg (now Bogor) in the west, to Surabaya in the east. Construction began from both ends, the first line (from Surabaya) being opened on 16 May 1878, and both cities were connected by 1894.

By the 1920s, the system in Java had reached its greatest extent, with most towns and cities connected by rail, with branches and tramways connecting sugar plantations to factories.

The Great Depression of the 1930s put laid to plans of constructing railway lines in Borneo, Celebes, connecting the lines in Sumatra and electrification of the lines in Java.

After the Dutch state started railway construction, private enterprises did not completely get out of the picture, and at least 15 light railway companies operated in Java. These companies operated as  "steam tram companies", but despite the name, were better described as regional secondary lines.

Java

As befits a colonial enterprise, most railway lines in Indonesia had a dual purpose: economic and strategic. In fact, a condition for the financial assistance for the NIS was that the company build a railway line to Ambarawa, which had an important fort named Willem I for the Dutch king. The first state railway line was built through the mountains on the southern part of Java, instead of the flat regions on the north, for a similar strategic reason. The state railway in Java connected Anyer on the western coast of the island, to Banyuwangi on the eastern coast.

Sumatra

In Sumatra, railways were first used for military purposes, with a railway line connecting Banda Aceh and its port of Uleelhee in 1876. This line was only transferred to the Ministry of Colonies from the Ministry of War on 1 January 1916, following the relative pacification of Aceh.

The Western Sumatra's state railway in the Minangkabau area, the Staatsspoorwegen ter Sumatra's Westkust (SSS) transported coal from inland mines to the port at Padang and was built between 1891 and 1894

The Southern Sumatra's state railway, the Staatsspoorwegen op Zuid-Sumatra (ZSS), was completed in the 1930s. It served a fertile plantation area and an important coal mine.

Another important private railway line was the Deli Spoorweg Maatschappij (DSM). This line served regions producing rubber and tobacco in Deli.

Sulawesi
Between July 1922 and 1930, a -long railway line operated in South Sulawesi. This line was to be extended to North Sulawesi, as part of a massive project of railway construction in Borneo and Sulawesi, connection of separate railway systems in Sumatra and electrification of the main lines in Java. The Great Depression of 1929 put paid to these plans.

Japanese occupation
During the Japanese occupation between 1942 and 1945, the different railway lines in Java were managed as one entity. The Sumatra systems, being under the administration of a different branch of the Japanese armed forces, remained separate.

The occupiers also converted the ( lines in Java into , thereby resolving the dual gauge issue. This was not an actual "problem" as there was not much transfer of materials between the systems, and much of the  system had been fitted with a third rail by 1940, creating a mixed-gauge railway. Many locomotives were seized and transported to Malaya, Burma and elsewhere.

Independence era
During the war for independence between 1945 and 1949, freedom fighters took over the railways, creating the first direct predecessor to today's PT Kereta Api, the Djawatan Kereta Api Repoeblik Indonesia (Railway Bureau of the Republic of Indonesia), on 28 September 1945. This date, not the 1867 one, is regarded as the birth date of Indonesian railways and commemorated as Railway Day every year, due to political ground.

On the other hand, the Dutch created its own combined railway system to manage the lines located on its occupied territory, the Verenigd Spoorwegbedrijf (Combined Railways). By the time of Dutch recognition of Indonesian independence, the VS had most railway lines under its management, though not all were in operation.

With Indonesia's full independence in 1949, the separate systems (except the Deli Railway) were combined into the Djawatan Kereta Api. Non-state railway systems in Java retained their paper existence until 1958, when all railway lines in Indonesia were nationalized, including the Deli Railway, thereby creating the Perusahaan Negara Kereta Api (PNKA: State Railway Corporation) in 1963. On 15 September 1971 the name of PNKA was changed to Perusahaan Jawatan Kereta Api (PJKA, the Indonesian Railway Systems). Later then, on 2 January 1991, PJKA was changed its name and status as Perusahaan Umum Kereta Api (Perumka, the Indonesian Railways Public Company), and since 1 June 1999, this company was changed to a limited company, PT Kereta Api (Persero) (PT KA). In May 2010, the name of "PT KA" was changed to PT Kereta Api Indonesia (Persero) (PT KAI, The Indonesian Railways Company) till present. 

The headquarters of the state railway system, since Dutch colonial days, had been located in Bandung, West Java. Private railway companies were headquartered elsewhere, in Semarang, Tegal, Surabaya and Medan.

Construction of new railway lines has been scarce. This plan had to be postponed due to the 1997 economic crisis. The first airport rail link in Indonesia, the Kualanamu Airport Rail Link, connects  with Kualanamu International Airport, which was inaugurated on 4 September 2013. The Soekarno–Hatta Airport Rail Link was opened between Soekarno–Hatta International Airport and BNI City on 26 December 2017. Minangkabau Ekspres, connecting Minangkabau International Airport and Padang, was inaugurated on 21 May 2018. The Trans-Sulawesi Railway is under construction, and is built with  standard gauge which is wider than the  cape gauge used in Java and older lines in Sumatra to accommodate more weight and speed.

Most new construction is concentrated on double- and quad-tracking of existing railway lines.

See also 
 List of railway companies in the Dutch East Indies
 Monorails in Central Java

References

Rail transport in Indonesia
Indonesia
Rail